In mathematics, a double affine braid group is a group containing the braid group of an affine Weyl group.  Their group rings have quotients  called double affine Hecke algebras in the same way that the group rings of affine braid groups have quotients that are affine Hecke algebras.

For affine An groups, the double affine braid group is the fundamental group of the space of n distinct points on a 2-dimensional torus.

References

 

Braid groups
Representation theory